The Haut commissariat à l'amazighité (HCA, English: High Commission for Amazighity) is a government department in Algeria overseeing the Berber (Amazigh) sphere.

In 2023, the Haut commissariat à l'amazighité recommended the generalization of mandatory Amazigh education to all Algerian schools.

References

External links
 HCA official site
 The High Commission for Amazighity (HCA)
 La création du Haut-Conseil à l’amazighité et de l’académie berbère en bonne voie

Government of Algeria